Gism may refer to:
 A slang term for semen
 GISM, a Japanese hardcore punk band